Irakli Chubinishvili (Irakli Chubini) is a former Ambassador Extraordinary and Plenipotentiary of the Republic of Georgia to the Russian Federation.

Previously a member of Zurab Zhvania's United Democrats Party, in February 2004, he was appointed by Georgian president Mikhail Saakashvili to the position of Chief of his administration. On 20 April 2005, the Georgian parliament approved the nomination of Chubinishvili to the post of ambassador of Georgia to Russia, a post he held until his resignation in January 2008. His replacement to the post in Moscow is Erosi Kitsmarishvili. After resignation Irakli Chubinishvili has moved to the United Kingdom and is involved in the private business consultancy.

See also
 Embassy of Georgia in Moscow

References

Diplomats of Georgia (country)
Living people
Ambassadors of Georgia (country) to Russia
Year of birth missing (living people)
Place of birth missing (living people)